Spring Valley Township Bridge No. E-31 is a historic bridge in rural Turner County, South Dakota, carrying 447th Avenue across unnamed stream west of  Viborg. Built in 1938, it was a well-preserved example of a stone bridge built for the county with funding from the Works Progress Administration. It was listed on the National Register of Historic Places in 1999.

Description and history
It is a three-arch stone structure, built out of native granite and quartzite, mostly of rubblestone with shaped voussoirs. The spandrel walls rise to form low parapets on the sides, topped with concrete coping and extended to flared wing walls. One of the central piers has had its base reinforced by concrete blocks.

This bridge is one of 180 stone arch bridges built in Turner County as part of New Deal-era federal jobs programs. The county administration was able to build stone bridges at a lower cost than then-conventional steel beam bridges because of the availability of experienced stone workers, and the federal subsidy to the wages they were paid. The county was responsible for supervising the work crews and providing the building materials. This bridge was built in 1938 by a county crew to a standardized state design.

See also
National Register of Historic Places listings in Turner County, South Dakota
List of bridges on the National Register of Historic Places in South Dakota

References

National Register of Historic Places in Turner County, South Dakota
Bridges on the National Register of Historic Places in South Dakota
Bridges completed in 1938
Transportation in Turner County, South Dakota